Love, Life and Laughter may refer to:

 Love, Life and Laughter (1923 film), a British drama
 Love, Life and Laughter (1934 film), a British comedy drama